People awarded the Honorary citizenship of the City of Bathurst, Australia are:

Honorary Citizens of Bathurst
Listed by date of award:

References

Bathurst
Bathurst
Honorary citizens of Bathurst
New South Wales-related lists